Petru Țurcaș (born 16 May 1976, in Timișoara) is a retired Romanian footballer.

Career
He began football at FC Politehnica Timișoara, eventually playing for Gloria Bistriţa, and Apulum Alba-Iulia. He was traded to CFR Cluj in early 2005. Țurcaș is best known for his performances with CFR Cluj in the 2005 Intertoto Cup campaign where he played 9 games, reaching the final.

Honours
Politehnica Timișoara
Divizia B: 1994–95
Unirea Alba Iulia
Divizia B: 2002–03
CFR Cluj
UEFA Intertoto Cup runner-up: 2005

References

External links

1976 births
Living people
Romanian footballers
FC Politehnica Timișoara players
FC CFR Timișoara players
ACF Gloria Bistrița players
Liga I players
Liga II players
CFR Cluj players
CSM Unirea Alba Iulia players
Association football goalkeepers
Sportspeople from Timișoara